The SL C20 is a type of subway train used in the Stockholm metro, Sweden. Between 1997 and 2004, 271 3-car sets, numbered 2000–2270, were delivered to Stockholm by the former Kalmar Verkstad, owned by Adtranz, later acquired by Bombardier Transportation. The C20 is a completely new design and therefore is not compatible with other train types in the system. At , each carriage is longer than the previous train types. To save cost and weight, each unit has only four bogies. The middle car has two bogies. The end parts consist of one bogie each and are connected to the central portion via a semi-trailer-direction. Trolley subframes are made of stainless steel, and are less susceptible to corrosion.

When the C20 was sold as the Vagn 2000, it was marketed as the subway car of the future. All C20 coaches have been given their own names, all proposed by private individuals. Many of the names are linked to Stockholm; for example, coach no. 2001 was christened Birger Jarl.

Refurbishment 
The C20F and the 270 3-car C20 sets will undergo a mid-life refurbishment at the Bombardier Transportation factory in Västerås, Västmanland between 2019 and 2023. During this period, the refurbished sets will be referred to as C20U or C25. The refurbishment will increase the standing capacity of all sets by converting one side of each car to all-longitudinal seating instead of the all-transverse seating currently in use, as well as removing a portion of seats in each end of a carriage to create spaces for wheelchairs and strollers. All seat upholstery will also be replaced and new yellow upholstery to designate priority seating will also be introduced, and each refurbished C20 set will be retrofitted with 16 CCTV cameras, an increase of 6 such cameras in each car prior to refurbishment.

C20F 
The C20F is a related prototype, built with "FICAS" technology – a highly innovative modular construction that uses a stainless steel skin bonded to a rigid composite core. This construction results in an extremely thin wall (25mm instead of the C20's 100mm), thereby creating a more spacious interior without altering the outer profile.

The C20F has air conditioning in both the driver's cab and the passenger compartments, whereas the C20 has air conditioning in the driver's cab only. The exterior of the C20F differs by having smooth trolley sub-frames instead of the corrugated trolley sub-frames present in the C20.

The C20F car assigned set 2000 and originally christened Incognito, then rechristened Elvira on 22 May 2012, when C20 set 2012, previously christened Elvira, was rechristened the Estelle on the occasion of Princess Estelle's baptism.

The C20F operates on the Green Line of the Stockholm metro.

Notes

References

External links 

 C20 info page (partially in Swedish)
 C20F info page (partially in Swedish)
 
 C20/C20F refurbishment project (in Swedish)

Bombardier Transportation multiple units
Multiple units of Sweden
Stockholm metro
750 V DC multiple units